The individual dressage event was one of six equestrian events on the Equestrian at the 1992 Summer Olympics programme. The competition was held at the Royal Polo Club in Barcelona.

The competition was split into two phases:

Grand Prix (2–3 August)
Riders performed the Grand Prix test. The sixteen riders with the highest scores advanced to the final (maximum 3 per nation).
Grand Prix Special (5 August)
Riders performed the Grand Prix Special test.

Results

References

External links
1992 Summer Olympics official report Volume 5, Part 1 p. 170. 

Individual dressage